Enallagma divagans, the turquoise bluet, is a species of narrow-winged damselfly in the family Coenagrionidae. It is endemic to the United States.

The IUCN conservation status of Enallagma divagans is "least concern", with no immediate threat to the species' survival. The population is stable.

References

Further reading

External links

 

Coenagrionidae
Odonata of North America
Insects of the United States
Endemic fauna of the United States
Taxa named by Edmond de Sélys Longchamps
Insects described in 1876
Articles created by Qbugbot